Richard Thurston (born January 6, 1973) is an American musician, songwriter and mixed martial artist. Thurston was born in Boston, Massachusetts, but moved to Florida in his late teens. He notably performed in such hardcore and metalcore bands as Timescape Zero, Culture, Blood Has Been Shed, Until the End, Diecast, Terror, Walls of Jericho and As Friends Rust. He has lived in and performed with bands from Florida, Virginia, Connecticut, Massachusetts, California, Michigan and Ohio, the latter of which has been his home since 1997. 

Thurston is a multi-instrumentalist musician and vocalist, having performed guitar, bass and drums in addition to vocals in several of his bands. He has also been straight-edge and vegan since the early 1990s, participating in several bands that vocalized those beliefs and ethics. 

Thurston began training as a mixed martial artist in 2003. During his inaugural amateur fight on November 5, 2004, he dislocated his elbow while against opponent Joshua Blanchard. In November 2006, Thurston became a professional fighter.

Bands
 Ego Trip - guitar 
 Severance - drums 
 Timescape Zero - guitar 
 Grip  - bass 
 Culture - guitar , bass guitar , lead vocals , drums 
 Elijah's Message - guitar 
 Prayers Unanswered  - guitar 
 Blood Has Been Shed - bass guitar , guitar 
 Until the End - guest vocals 
 Diecast - guitar 
 Broken Glass Everywhere - guitar 
 One Nation Under - guitar 
 Terror - bass guitar 
 Against - guitar 
 Still Crossed - guitar 
 Walls of Jericho - touring bass guitar 
 Anthem - guitar 
 On Bodies - guitar, bass guitar, drums 
 Justified Defiance - vocals 
 Treason - guitar, drums 
 Deep Breath - vocals, guitar, bass guitar, drums 
 Lowest - guitar, bass guitar, drums 
 As Friends Rust - drums

References

External links

 Interview with Music Scan (2002)
 Interview with No Echo (2018)
 Interview with No Echo (2019)
 Interview with Mass Movement (2020)
 Interview with Decibel Magazine (2021)

1973 births
20th-century American bass guitarists
20th-century American drummers
20th-century American guitarists
20th-century American singers
21st-century American bass guitarists
21st-century American drummers
21st-century American guitarists
21st-century American singers
American heavy metal bass guitarists
American heavy metal guitarists
American male bass guitarists
American male guitarists
American male mixed martial artists
American rock songwriters
American punk rock bass guitarists
American punk rock drummers
American punk rock guitarists
American punk rock singers
As Friends Rust members
Culture (American band) members
Blood Has Been Shed members
Guitarists from Florida
Guitarists from Ohio
Hardcore punk musicians
Heavyweight mixed martial artists
Living people
Mixed martial artists from Florida
Songwriters from Florida
Sportspeople from Florida
Terror (band) members
Walls of Jericho (band) members